A non-native speech database is a speech database of non-native pronunciations of English. Such databases are used in the development of: multilingual automatic speech recognition systems, text to speech systems, pronunciation trainers, and second language learning systems.

List 


 The actual table with information about the different databases is shown in Table 2.

Legend
In the table of non-native databases some abbreviations for language names are used. They are listed in Table 1. Table 2 gives the following information about each corpus: The name of the corpus, the institution where the corpus can be obtained, or at least further information should be available, the language which was actually spoken by the speakers, the number of speakers, the native language of the speakers, the total amount of non-native utterances the corpus contains, the duration in hours of the non-native part, the date of the first public reference to this corpus, some free text highlighting special aspects of this database and a reference to another publication. The reference in the last field is in most cases to the paper which is especially devoted to describe this corpus by the original collectors. In some cases it was not possible to identify such a paper. In these cases a paper is referenced which is using this corpus is.

Some entries are left blank and others are marked with unknown. The difference here is that blank entries refer to attributes where the value is just not known. Unknown entries, however, indicate that no information about this attribute is available in the database itself. As an example, in the Jupiter weather database no information about the origin of the speakers is given. Therefore this data would be less useful for verifying accent detection or similar issues.

Where possible, the name is a standard name of the corpus, for some of the smaller corpora, however, there was no established name and hence an identifier had to be created. In such cases, a combination of the institution and the collector of the database is used.

In the case where the databases contain native and non-native speech, only attributes of the non-native part of the corpus are listed. Most of the corpora are collections of read speech. If the corpus instead consists either partly or completely of spontaneous utterances, this is mentioned in the Specials column.

References

English as a second or foreign language
Speech recognition
Types of databases